The National Register of Historic Places listings in Syracuse, New York are described below. There are 116 listed properties and districts in the city of Syracuse, including 19 business or public buildings, 13 historic districts, 6 churches, four school or university buildings, three parks, six apartment buildings, and 43 houses. Twenty-nine of the listed houses were designed by architect Ward Wellington Ward; 25 of these were listed as a group in 1996.

The more than 50 properties and districts in Onondaga County outside Syracuse are listed in National Register of Historic Places listings in Onondaga County, New York. One property, the New York State Barge Canal, spans both the city and the county. The locations of National Register properties and districts with known coordinates can be viewed in map form.



KEY

Current listings in Syracuse

 

|}

Former listings

|}

See also
National Register of Historic Places listings in New York

References

External links

 National Register of Historic Places.com: Onondaga County, NY listings — a private site for NRHP information for the above historic sites, with street addresses and other info.
 — MPS = multiple property submission.

Library.syr.edu: "The Greek Revival in Syracuse" — online book of Greek Revival architecture in Syracuse.

.
Syracuse
NRHP01
Syracuse, New York